WLT: A Radio Romance is a 1991 novel by Garrison Keillor. The book reached the top ten of The New York Times Best Seller list in 1991.

Summary
The story is about people associated with a fictional Minneapolis radio station called WLT. The events of the book span from the early years of radio broadcasting until the early years of television.

Reception
Writing for The New York Times Book Review, Anne Bernays said, "WLT is a much darker book than one would expect from its first few exuberant and hilarious chapters…"

References

1991 novels
American comedy novels
Novels by Garrison Keillor
Novels set in Minneapolis